This is a list of Slovenes and people from Slovenia that are notable.

Artists including performing arts 

 Zvest Apollonio (1935–2009) – painter and graphic artist
 Stanislava Brezovar (1937–2003) – ballerina
 Franz Caucig (1755–1828) – Neoclassical painter
 Anton Cebej (1722–1774) – Baroque painter
 Avgust Černigoj (1898–1985) – painter
 Jože Ciuha (1924–2015) – painter, graphic artist and illustrator
 Ivan Grohar (1867–1911) – painter
 Anton Gvajc (1865–1935) – painter
 Herman Gvardjančič (born 1943) – painter
 Stane Jagodič (born 1943) – painter, graphic artist, montager and illustrator
 Božidar Jakac (1899–1989) – painter, graphic artist and illustrator
 Rihard Jakopič (1869–1943) – painter
 Matija Jama (1872–1947) – impressionist painter
 Laurenz Janscha (1749–1812) – landscape painter and engraver
 Anton Karinger (1829–1870) – painter and poet
 Ivana Kobilca (1861–1926) – realist painter
 Lojze Logar (1944–2014) – painter and graphic artist
 Adriana Maraž (1931–2015) – painter and graphic artist
 Pino Mlakar (1907–2006) – ballet dancer and choreographer
 Marko Mušič (born 1941) – architect
 Zoran Mušič (1909–2005) – painter
 Miki Muster (1925–2018) – illustrator
 Veno Pilon (1896–1970) – painter
 Jože Plečnik (1872–1957) – architect
 Marjetica Potrč (born 1953) – artist
 Jakob Savinšek (1922–1961) – sculptor
 Matej Sternen (1870–1949) – painter
 Michael Stroy (1803–1871) – painter
 Vladimir Šubic (1894–1946) – architect
 Jožef Tominc (1790–1866) – painter
 Joseph Urbania (1877–1943) – sculptor
 Ivan Vurnik (1884–1971) – architect and town planner

Authors 

 Louis Adamic (1898–1951) – author and translator
 Anton Aškerc (1856–1912) – poet and Roman Catholic priest
 Frederic Baraga (1797–1868) – bishop, author
 Vladimir Bartol (1903–1967) – author
 France Bevk (1890–1970) – author
 Franjo Bučar – writer of Slovenian descent
 Ivan Cankar (1876–1918) – author, poet, storyteller, playwright, and essayist
 Matija Čop (1797–1835) – author
 Mate Dolenc (born 1945) – author
 Fran Saleški Finžgar (1871–1963) – author and priest
 France Forstnerič (1933–2007) – author, poet and journalist
 Alojz Gradnik (1882–1967) – poet and translator
 Simon Gregorčič (1844–1906) – poet and Roman Catholic priest
 Peter Handke (born 1942) –  author (Slovenian mother; born and raised in Austria and has never lived in Slovenia)
 Janez Jalen (1891–1966) – author
 Drago Jančar (born 1948) – author and dramatist
 Simon Jenko (1835–1869) – poet, lyricist, writer
 Jože Javoršek (1920–1990) – author
 Branka Jurca (1914–1999) – author
 Josip Jurčič (1844–1881) – author
 János Kardos (1801–1875) – writer, teacher and priest
 Alma Karlin (1889–1950) – writer and poet
 Dragotin Kette (1876–1899) – poet
 Edvard Kocbek (1904–1981) – poet and writer
 Srečko Kosovel (1904–1926) – poet
 József Kossics (1788–1867) – writer, poet, historian, priest
 Tomo Križnar (born 1954) – world traveller, humanitarian, author
 Lovro Kuhar (1893–1950) – author
 Miklós Küzmics (1737–1804) – writer and translator
 Feri Lainšček (born 1959) – writer, poet
 Fran Levstik (1831–1887) – author
 Anton Tomaž Linhart (1756–1795) – playwright and historian
 Cvetka Lipuš (born 1959) – author
 Florjan Lipuš (born 1937) – author
 Franko Luin (1941–2005) – author, editor, typographer
 Rudolf Maister (1874–1934) – poet, military officer
 Mira Mihelič (1912–1985) – author
 Frane Milčinski (1914–1988) – poet, satirist, humorist
 Miha Mazzini (born 1961) – author
 Boris Pahor (born 1913) – author
 Ivan Potrč (1913–1993) – author
 Sebastijan Pregelj (born 1970) – author
 France Prešeren (1800–1849) – poet
 Benka Pulko (born 1967) – author and Guinness World Record setting world traveler
 Miha Remec (1928–2020) – author
 Anton Martin Slomšek (1800–1862) – bishop, author, poet and national awakener
 Tomaž Šalamun (1941–2014) – poet
 Damijan Šinigoj (born 1964) – author and translator
 Josip Stritar (1836–1923) – poet, author, and editor
 Ivan Tavčar (1851–1923) – author, lawyer and politician
 Janez Trdina (1830–1905) – author
 Primož Trubar (1508–1586) – Protestant reformer and author
 Josipina Urbančič (1508–1586) – poet, writer
 Josip Vidmar (1895–1992) – essayist and literary critic
 Vitomil Zupan (1914–1987) – writer

Inventors 

 Ivo Boscarol (born 1956) – light aircraft designer and manufacturer
 Joseph Fuisz (born 1970) – filed thirty-five patents relating to drug delivery and computer fields
 Richard Fuisz (born 1939) – pharmaceutical inventor of controlled release drug beads, quick dissolve tablet systems, thin film drug delivery systems as well as various medical devices, diagnostic devices and electronic mail patents
 Japec Jakopin (born 1951) – yacht designer
 Alojz Knafelc (1859–1937) – creator of Slovenian trail blaze
 Herman Potočnik (a.k.a. Noordung, 1892–1929), one of the founders of astronautics
 Johann Puch (Slovene: Janez Puh) (1862–1914) – inventor, innovator, industrial designer and manufacturer
 Johann Pucher (Slovene: Janez Auguštin Puhar) (1814–1864) – priest, photographer, painter and poet – invented a photography on the glass in 1842.
 Edvard Rusjan (1886–1911) – pilot and aeronautic pioneer

Military personnel 

 Karel Destovnik Kajuh (1922–1944) – poet and Yugoslav people's hero
 Alenka Ermenc (born 1963) – officer in the Slovenian Armed Forces and NATO's Chief of defence
 Karl Novak (1905–1975) – commander of the Slovene Chetniks during World War II
 Odilo Globočnik (1904–1945) – prominent Nazi and later an SS leader
 Anton Haus (1851–1917) – Grand Admiral of the Austro-Hungarian Navy
 Pepca Kardelj (1914–1990) – partisan and political activist
 Johann Katzianer (1491–1539) – aristocrat and Imperial Army commander
 Dušan Kveder (1915–1966) – soldier, military commander and diplomat
 Rudolf Maister (1874–1934) – general and poet
 Franjo Malgaj (1894–1919) – Austro-Hungarian military leader
 Johann Mickl (1893–1945) –  Austrian-born Generalleutnant of Slovenian descent
 Leon Rupnik (1880–1946) – Yugoslav general, inspector-general of the Slovenian Home Guard
 Franc Rozman (1911–1944) – Partisan general and Yugoslav people's hero

Film, radio and television 

 Vinci Vogue Anžlovar (born 1963) – film director
 Valentin Areh (born 1971) – war correspondent and TV journalist
 Miha Baloh (born 1928) – actor
 Matija Barl (1940–2018) – actor
 Polde Bibič (1933–2012) – actor
 Demeter Bitenc (1922–2018) – actor
 David Boreanaz (born 1971) – actor, father of remote Slovenian descent
 Špela Čadež (born 1977) - film director
 František Čap (1913–1972) – film director
 George Dolenz (1908–1963) – (born Jure Dolenc) movie/TV actor, father of actor/musician Micky Dolenz and grandfather of actress Ami Dolenz
 Micky Dolenz (born 1945) – actor and musician, son of George Dolenz
 Rudi Dolezal (born 1958) – Austrian film producer and film director
 Mira Furlan (1955–2021) – actress, father of Slovenian descent
 Karpo Godina (born 1943) – film director, cameraman and  montage editor
 Melissa Joan Hart (born 1976) – actress, mother of Slovenian descent
 Andrej Hieng (1925–2000) – storyteller, dramatist, film director and stage editor
 Boštjan Hladnik (1929–2006) – film director, scenarist and montage editor
 Željko Ivanek – Hollywood actor
 Anthony Jeselnik (born 1978) – comedian of Slovenian descent
 Polona Juh (born 1971) – actress
 Damjan Kozole (born 1964) – film director and scenarist
 Janez Lapajne (born 1967) – film director
 Jože Pogačnik (1932–2016) – film director and scenarist
 Igor Pretnar (1924–1977) – film and theatre director
 Janko Ravnik (1891–1982) – film director, pianist, composer, pedagogue, and photographer
 Tanja Ribič (born 1968) – actress and singer
 Ita Rina (1907–1979) – actress
 Franci Slak (1953–2007) – film and TV director and scenarist
 Danijel Sraka (born 1975) – film director
 France Štiglic (1919–1993) – film director
 Zlatko Šugman (1932–2008) – actor
 Alice Tumler (born 1978) – TV presenter, father of Slovenian–Italian descent
 Christoph Waltz (born 1956) – actor, mother of Slovenian descent
 Jonas Žnidaršič (born 1962) – actor and TV journalist

Musicians and composers 

 Bojan Adamič (1912–1995) – composer and conductor
 Blaž Arnič (1901–1970) – composer
 Slavko Avsenik (1929–2015) – composer and musician
 Helena Blagne Zaman (born 1963) – singer
 Lojze Bratuž (1902–1937) – composer, choirmaster
 Ciril Cvetko (1920–1999) – composer, conductor, pedagogue, and journalist
 Micky Dolenz (born 1945) – drummer of The Monkees (Slovenian father; born and raised in the United States and has never lived in Slovenia)
 Jakob Gallus Petelin (1550–1591) – composer and conductor
 Jani Golob (born 1948) – composer and violinist
 Alenka Gotar (born 1979) – soprano singer
 Senida Hajdarpašić (known as Senidah) (born 1985) – singer and composer
Karen Kamensek (born 1970) – conductor of Slovenian descent
Božidar Kantušer (1921–1999) – composer
Herbert von Karajan (1908–1989) – composer
Maja Keuc – singer
Marjan Kozina (1907–1966) – composer
Zala Kralj (born 1999) – singer
Lina Kuduzović (born 2002) – singer
Marijan Lipovšek (1910–1995) – composer, pianist, pedagogue, musical essayist
Marjana Lipovšek (born 1946) – opera singer, mezzo-soprano
Magnifico (born 1965) – composer and singer
Joey Miskulin (born 1949) – accordionist of Slovenian descent
Omar Naber – singer-songwriter, guitarist
Mr. Doctor – vocalist and composer of the Devil Doll
Tito in ekšn – punk rock band of the 1990s
Tomaž Pengov – composer, musician and singer
Zoran Predin (born 1958) – composer and singer
Oto Pestner – composer, musician and singer
Jože Privšek (1937–1998) – composer and musician
Raay (Maraaya) (born 1984) – composer
Anja Rupel (born 1966) – singer and radio announcer
Gašper Šantl (born 1996) – singer and composer
Nina Šenk (born 1982) – classical composer
Majda Sepe – singer
Lojze Slak (1932–2011) – composer and musician
Adi Smolar – composer, musician and singer
Ana Soklič – singer-songwriter
Karmen Stavec (born 1973) – musician and singer
Dubravka Tomšič Srebotnjak (born 1940) – pianist and musical pedagogue
Audrey Totter (1917–2013) – actress (Slovenian father; born and lived in the United States; never lived in Slovenia)
Marjetka Vovk (Maraaya) (born 1984) – singer and composer
Sare Havliček (born 1974) – musical producer
Hugo Wolf (1860–1903) – composer
"Weird Al" Yankovic (born 1959) – singer and musician of Slovenian descent
Frankie Yankovic (1915–1998) – Grammy-award winning accordion player and polka musician of Slovenian descent

Philosophers 

Mladen Dolar (born 1951) – philosopher, cofounder of the Ljubljana school of psychoanalysis
Herman of Carinthia (1105/1110 – after 1154) – philosopher, astronomer, astrologer, mathematician
Tine Hribar (born 1941) – philosopher
Milan Komar (1921–2006) – philosopher
Josip Križan (1841–1921) – mathematician, physicist, philosopher, astronomer
Leonid Pitamic (1885–1971) – philosopher of law
Avguštin Stegenšek (1875–1920) – philosopher, theologian, art historian
Anton Strle (1915–2003) – theologian
Ivo Urbančič (1930–2016) – philosopher
Ludwig Wittgenstein (1889–1951) – philosopher, in part of Slovenian descent
Slavoj Žižek (born 1949) – sociologist, philosopher, and cultural critic
Alenka Zupančič (born 1966) – philosopher and cultural critic

Politicians 

 Andrej Bajuk (1943–2011) – third prime minister of independent Slovenia
 John Blatnik (1911–1991) –  U.S. Congressman (Slovenian parents; born and raised in the United States, and never lived in Slovenia)
 Leonard J. Bodack (1932–2015) – former Pennsylvania State Senator (Slovenian ancestry; born and raised in the United States, and never lived in Slovenia)
 Jože Brilej (1910–1981) – Yugoslav politician, diplomat and ambassador, President of the United Nations Security Council (1956)
 Josip Broz Tito (1892–1980) – president of the Socialist Federative Republic of Yugoslavia between 1945 and 1980 (son of a  Slovenian mother, Marija Javeršek and of a Croat father, Franjo Broz) 
 Leo von Caprivi (1831–1899) – German major general and statesman who served as German Chancellor from March 1890 to October 1894 (His family (complete surname: von Caprivi de Caprera de Montecuccoli) was of Italian and disputed Slovenian origin; born and raised in Germany, and never lived in Slovenia)
 Janez Drnovšek (1950–2008) – second prime minister of independent Slovenia, third president of Slovenia, 2003–2008
 Tom Harkin – U.S. Senator (Slovenian mother; born and raised in the United States and never lived in Slovenia)
 Janez Janša (born 1958) – fifth prime minister of independent Slovenia
 Edvard Kardelj (1910–1979) – prewar communist, politician, statesman, and journalist
 Boris Kidrič (1912–1953) – communist, politician, statesman and economist
 Amy Jean Klobuchar (born 1960) – U.S. Senator from Minnesota (Father's grandparents came from Slovenia; born and raised in United States, has never lived in Slovenia)
 Anton Korošec (1872–1940) – prominent Yugoslav politician
 Milan Kučan (born 1941) – first president of independent Slovenia, 1991–2002
 Frank Lausche (1895–1990) – former U.S. Senator, Governor of Ohio & Mayor of Cleveland (Parents of Slovenian origin; born and raised in the United States and never lived in Slovenia)
 Vladko Maček (1879–1964) – Croatian politician of Slovene origin from the first half of the 20th century. He led the Croatian Peasant Party (HSS)
 James Oberstar (1934–2014) – U.S. Representative from Minnesota (Partial Slovenian ancestry; born and raised in the United States and never lived in Slovenia)
 Lojze Peterle (born 1948) – first prime minister of independent Slovenia
 Wolfgang Petritsch (born 1947) – Austrian diplomat of Slovene ethnicity (former OHR)
 Tanya Plibersek – Australian politician – House of Representatives
 Anton Rop (born 1960) – fourth prime minister of independent Slovenia
 Gregorij Rožman (1883–1959) – Bishop of Ljubljana (1930–1945), collaborator with Italian and German occupying forces during the Second World War
 Marjan Šarec (born 1977) – Slovene prime minister
 Kurt Schuschnigg (1897–1977) – Chancellor of Austria, of Slovenian descent
 Danilo Türk (born 1952) – President elect of Slovenia
 Walter Veltroni (born 1955) – Mayor of Rome (Slovenian mother)
 George Voinovich – U.S. Senator, former Governor of Ohio and Mayor of Cleveland, (Slovenian mother; born and raised in the United States, never lived in Slovenia)
 Anton Vratuša (1915–2017) – politician and diplomat, who was the Prime Minister of Slovenia from 1978–80 and of the Socialist Federal Republic of Yugoslavia, also its ambassador to the United Nations

Scientists and scholars 

 Robert Blinc (1933–2011) – physicist
 Ivan Bratko (born 1946) – computer scientist
 Srečko Brodar (1893–1987) – palaeontologist
 Andrej Čadež (born 1942) – astrophysicist
 Avrelija Cencič (1964–2012) – biochemist
 Lavo Čermelj (1889–1980) – physicist
 Dragotin Cvetko (1911–1993) – musicologist
 Davorin Dolar (1921–2005) – chemist
 Josip Globevnik (born 1945) – mathematician
 Pavel Grošelj (1883–1940) – biologist and belletrist
 Jovan Hadži (1884–1972) – biologist
 Anton Janežič (1828–1869) – Slavic specialist and grammarian
 Jernej Kopitar (1780–1844) – philologist
 Peter Kosler (1824–1879) – lawyer, geographer, cartographer, politician, and manufacturer
 Ivo Lah (1896–1979) – mathematician
 Tine Logar (1916–2002) – philologist and dialectologist
 Thomas Luckmann (1927–2016) – sociologist
 Anton Melik (1890–1966) – geographer
 Franz Miklosich (1813–1891) – philologist
 Avgust Pavel (1886–1946) – ethnologist
 Anton Peterlin (1908–1993) – physicist
 Josip Plemelj (1873–1967) – mathematician
 Herman Potočnik (a.k.a. Noordung, 1892–1929) – pioneer of astronautics and cosmonautics, and rocket engineer
 Fritz Pregl (1869–1930) – chemist, Nobel prize for chemistry 1923
 Janko Prunk (born 1942) – historian
 Fran Ramovš (1890–1952) – philologist and dialectologist
 Zoran Rant (1904–1972) – mechanical engineer
 Simon Rutar (1851–1903) – historian, geographer, archaeologist and geologist
 Ljubo Sirc (1920–2016) – economist
 Boris Sket (born 1936) – zoologist
 Branko Stanovnik (born 1938) – chemist
 Jožef Stefan (1835–1893) – physicist and mathematician
 Janez Strnad (1934–2015) – physicist and populariser of natural science
 Jože Toporišič (1926–2014) – philologist
 Denis Trček (born 1963) – computer scientist
 Anton Trstenjak (1906–1996) – psychologist and theologian
 Johann Weikhard von Valvasor (1641–1693) – nobleman and polymath
 Jurij Bartolomej Vega (1754–1802) – mathematician, physicist and artillery officer
 Ivan Vidav (1918–2015) – mathematician
 Milan Vidmar (1885–1962) – electrical engineer, chess player, and chess theorist
 Valentin Vodnik (1758–1819) – poet, journalist, philologist
 Egon Zakrajšek (1941–2002) – mathematician and computer scientist
 Miroslav Zei (1914–2006) – marine biologist

Athletes 

 Vili Ameršek – football player
 Alenka Bikar – sprinter, Olympic athlete
 Valter Birsa (born 1986) – footballer
 Jaka Blažič (born 1990) – basketball player
 Fredi Bobic (born 1971) – footballer of Slovenian descent
 Vinko Bogataj – ski jumper, featured in the Wide World of Sports Agony of Defeat video
 Nataša Bokal (born 1967) – skier
 Borut Božič – cyclist
 Janez Brajkovič – cyclist
 Primož Brezec (born 1979) – basketball player (NBA)
 Brigita Brezovac (born 1979) – IFBB professional bodybuilder
 Brigita Bukovec (born 1970) – athlete, Olympic athlete
 Anja Čarman – swimmer
 Jolanda Čeplak (born 1976) – Olympic athlete
 Miroslav Cerar (born 1939) – gymnast, Olympic athlete
 Iztok Čop (born 1972) – rower, Olympic athlete
 Alenka Cuderman (born 1961) – handball player, Olympic athlete
 Rudolf Cvetko (1880–1977) – fencer, Olympic athlete
 Ivo Daneu – basketball player
 Matjaž Debelak (born 1965) – ski jumper, Olympic athlete
 Rajmond Debevec (born 1963) – shooter, Olympic athlete
 Luka Dončić – basketball player, No. 3 overall pick in the 2018 NBA Draft, NBA player for the Dallas Mavericks
 Polona Dornik – basketball player, Olympic athlete
 Alenka Dovžan – alpine skier, Olympic athlete
 Goran Dragić – basketball player (NBA), Serbian father and Slovene mother
 Zoran Dragić – basketball player (NBA), Serbian father and Slovene mother
 Ana Drev (born 1985) – alpine skier
 Vital Eiselt (born 1941) – basketball player
 Vesna Fabjan – cross-country skier
 Saša Farič – freestyle skier
 Maruša Ferk – alpine skier
 Jure Franko – alpine skier, Olympic athlete
 Damjan Fras – ski jumper, Olympic athlete
 Tim Gajser (born 1996) – motocross racer (MXGP)
 Janja Garnbret (born 1999) – rock climber
 Meta Hrovat (born 1998) – alpine skier
 Urška Hrovat – alpine skier, Olympic athlete
 Sait Idrizi (born 1990) – football player
 Sara Isaković (born 1988) – swimmer
 Milan Janša (born 1965) – rower
 Mima Jaušovec (born 1956) – female tennis player
 Simon Jecl (born 1986) – freestyle skier
 Andrej Jerman – alpine skier
 Marjan Kandus (born 1932) – basketball player
 Davo Karničar (born 1962) – alpine and extreme skier
 Srečko Katanec (born 1963) – football player and selector, Olympic athlete
 Peter Kauzer (born 1983) – slalom canoeist, Olympic athlete
 Jani Klemenčič (born 1971) – rower
 Anže Kopitar – NHL hockey player, Olympic athlete
 Jure Košir – alpine skier, Olympic athlete
 Žan Košir – snowboarder
 Katja Koren – alpine skier, Olympic athlete
 Primož Kozmus – hammer thrower, Olympic athlete
 Robert Kranjec – alpine ski jumper
 Žan Kranjec – alpine skier
 Rene Krhin (born 1990) – football player
 Bojan Križaj (born 1957) – alpine skier, Olympic athlete
 Miha Lokar (born 1935) – basketball player
 Petra Majdič – cross country skier, Olympic athlete
 Andreja Mali (born 1977) – biathlete
 Tina Maze – alpine skier
 Ariel McDonald – basketball player
 Miha Mevlja – football player
 Marko Milič – basketball player
 Sašo Mirjanič (1968–1994) – rower
 Matej Mohorič – cyclist
 Radoslav Nesterovič – basketball player (NBA)
 Bogdan Norčič – alpine ski jumper
 Branko Oblak (born 1947) – football player
 Jan Oblak – football player
 Bruno Parma (born 1941) – chess player
 Franci Petek – ski jumper, Olympic athlete
 Primož Peterka (born 1979) – ski jumper, Olympic athlete
 Borut Petrič (born 1961) – swimmer
 Darjan Petrič (born 1964) – swimmer
 Rok Petrovič (1966–1993) – alpine skier
 Vasja Pirc (1907–1980) – chess player
 Tadej Pogačar – cyclist
 Lucija Polavder (born 1984) – judoka, Olympic athlete
 Klemen Prepelič (born 1992) – basketball player
 Špela Pretnar – alpine skier
 Peter Prevc (born 1992) – ski jumper
 Josip Primožič (1900–1985) – gymnast, Olympic athlete
 Iztok Puc – handball player
 Alenka Cuderman (born 1961) – handball player, Olympic athlete
 Jure Robič (1965–2010) – marathon cyclist
 Primož Roglič – cyclist
 Mladen Rudonja – football player
 Benjamin Savšek – slalom canoeist, Olympic athlete
 Uroš Slokar – basketball player (NBA)
 Luka Špik (born 1979) – rower, Olympic athlete
 Andraž Šporar (born 1994) – football player
 Katarina Srebotnik – tennis player
 Elvis Stojko – figure skater
 Boris Strel – alpine skier, Olympic athlete
 Martin Strel (born 1954) – ultra marathon swimmer
 Ilka Štuhec (born 1990) – alpine skier
 Leon Štukelj (1898–1999) – gymnast, Olympic athlete
 Mateja Svet (born 1968) – alpine skier, Olympic athlete
 Miran Tepeš – ski jumper, Olympic athlete
 Tina Trstenjak – judoka, Olympic athlete
 Beno Udrih – basketball player (NBA)
 Primož Ulaga – ski jumper, Olympic athlete
 Tadej Valjavec – cyclist
 Andraž Vehovar – slalom canoeist, Olympic athlete
 Anamari Velenšek – judoka
 Benjamin Verbič – football player
 Peter Vilfan – basketball player
 Sasha Vujačić – basketball player (NBA), Serbian father and Slovene mother
 Zlatko Zahovič (born 1971) – football player
 Miha Zajc (born 1994) – football player
 Vasilij Žbogar (born 1975) – sailor, Olympic athlete
 Jure Zdovc – basketball player, Olympic athlete
 Tamara Zidanšek – tennis player
 Urška Žolnir (born 1981) – judoka, Olympic athlete
 Peter Žonta – alpine ski jumper
 Aljoša Žorga – basketball player
 Matjaž Zupan – alpine ski jumper, Olympic athlete
 Denis Žvegelj – rower, Olympic athlete

Other people 

 Danilo Dolci (1924–1997) – sociologist and political activist (Slovenian mother)
 Aleš Hlad – supermoto racer and 2005 European Champion
 Ivan Kramberger (1936–1992) – philanthropist
 Klemen Pevec(Pylo) – software developer (develops MCreator since in 2020 the project was abandoned by its original owner)
 Shenphen Rinpoche (born 1969) – abbot of first Buddhist Congregation in Slovenia
 Walter Wolf (born 1939) – businessman
 Melania Trump (born Melanija Knavs, later changed to Knauss, 1970) – model, spouse of U.S. President Donald Trump, former First Lady of the United States of America

See also 
 List of people by nationality
 List of Slovene writers and poets in Hungary
 List of Slovenian artists
 List of Slovenian computer scientists
 List of Slovenian playwrights
 List of Slovenian mathematicians
 List of Slovenian physicists
 Slovenian Americans
 Slovenian Canadians

References

External links 
 https://archive.today/20130104154830/http://www.randburg.com/si/general/slo8.html